The 2022 World Rowing U23 Championships is the 18th edition of the World Rowing U23 Championships and was held from 25 July to 30 July 2022 in Varese, Italy along with the 2022 World Rowing Junior Championships.

Men's events

Women's events

Medal table

Participants 
A total of 780 rowers from the national teams of the following 56 countries was registered to compete at 2022 World Rowing U23 Championships.

 (3)
 (6)
 (38)
 (11)
 (1)
 (1)
 (5)
 (8)
 (3)
 (27)
 (8)
 (4)
 (5)
 (1)
 (20)
 (14)
 (14)
 (16)
 (2)
 (39)
 (70)
 (46)
 (10)
 (14)
 (10)
 (3)
 (66)
 (8)
 (2)
 (4)
 (11)
 (8)
 (4)
 (1)
 (27)
 (29)
 (7)
 (3)
 (4)
 (24)
 (2)
 (1)
 (44)
 (2)
 (2)
 (4)
 (16)
 (16)
 (1)
 (2)
 (5)
 (17)
 (68)
 (13)
 (8)
 (2)

See also 
 2022 World Rowing Championships
 2022 World Rowing Junior Championships

References

External links 
 WorldRowing website

World Rowing U23 Championships
Rowing competitions in Italy
2022 in Italian sport
International sports competitions hosted by Italy
2022 in rowing
World Rowing